Philipp Bandi (born 28 September 1977) is a Swiss track and field athlete competing mainly in the 5000 metres and middle distance events. Bandi competed in the 5000 metres at the 2008 Summer Olympics in Beijing, but failed to qualify for the final.

References

1977 births
Living people
Swiss male middle-distance runners
Swiss male long-distance runners
Olympic athletes of Switzerland
Athletes (track and field) at the 2008 Summer Olympics